Watlington railway station (formerly known as Magdalen Road) is on the Fen line in the east of England, serving the village of Watlington, Norfolk. Its three-letter station code is WTG.

The station and most trains calling are operated by Great Northern (with service to and from ), with some additional peak services being operated by Abellio Greater Anglia (to and from London Liverpool Street).

History 

The Bill for the Lynn and Ely Railway received Royal Assent on 30 June 1845. Work started on the line in 1846 and the line and its stations were opened on 27 October 1846. Watlington station opened with the line and was, as it is now, situated South of Lynn station (now King's Lynn). The station to the south was St Germain's station. The line ran from Ely to Downham, the eventual destination being Ely.

Watlington station, from 1847 part of the East Anglian Railway, became part of the Great Eastern Railway in 1862, and was renamed Magdalen Road in 1875 (a name which, perhaps, better reflects its lonely rural location in the middle of the flatlands of the East Anglian Fens). From 1848 onwards, Watlington was a junction, as a line once branched off from there to Wisbech. The branch, along with Magdalen Road station, was closed in 1968.

Due to local efforts, however, Magdalen Road station was reopened in 1975, and in 1989 returned to its original title of Watlington. The signal box at the station, in active use today, still bears a Network SouthEast sign with the Magdalen Road name. The current southbound platform, behind the signal box, dates from the early 1990s; the original station buildings on the southbound side have since been converted into a private residence. The original wooden waiting room on the northbound platform was replaced around the same time, though the original platform still survives as part of an extended platform.

Before electrification, services were normally operated by InterCity (latterly Network SouthEast) locomotive-hauled trains, normally pulling British Rail Mark 2b coaches (many services featured restaurant cars). The locomotives were usually Class 37 diesel-electrics, sometimes Class 31s or 47s. Off-peak links were often provided by Metro-Cammell diesel multiple units.

The station is mentioned by author Lisa St Aubin de Teran in a memoir as being the station closest to her Norfolk home - she reminisced about conversations with the train guard who was checking tickets, where she requested that the train stop at the station (for many years, most trains only called at the station if a passenger requested it, rather than it being a regular timetabled stop).

Services  
Great Northern operate all off-peak services at Watlington using  EMUs.

The typical off-peak service in trains per hour is:
 1 tph to 
 1 tph to 

During the peak hours, additional Great Northern services run to the station as well as a single Greater Anglia service to and from London Liverpool Street.

References

External links 

Railway stations in Norfolk
DfT Category E stations
Former Great Eastern Railway stations
Railway stations in Great Britain opened in 1846
Railway stations in Great Britain closed in 1968
Railway stations in Great Britain opened in 1975
Reopened railway stations in Great Britain
Railway stations served by Govia Thameslink Railway
Greater Anglia franchise railway stations